The Anjarakandi River is one of two major rivers that flows through the Kannur District of Kerala in India. The river originates from the slopes of the Western Ghats bordering Wayanad and Kannur districts. The 48 km long river flows in the western direction emptying into the Arabian Sea at Dharmadom.

Course
The Anjarakandy river originates in the slopes of the Western Ghats at the border of the Wayanad and Kannur districts. The river then flows through the hilly towns of Nedumpoyil, Kannavam, Cheruvanchery, Manatheri, Kandamkunnu, Chittaripparamba and Vengoor. Many minor tributaries like Mattanur river and Peravoor river joins the Anjarakandy at this region. Then the river plunges out of the hilly terrain into the Malabar plains. It then passes through Keezhalloor, Paduvilayi, Anjarakandy, Peralassery, Keezhathur, Mambaram and Palayad. At reaching Dharmadom the river empties into the Arabian Sea.

Name
The river Anjarakandy is flowing through the Anjarakandy village of Kannur district. This place is prominent for its Cinnamon estate.

Gallery

References

Rivers of Kannur district